John Bew may refer to:
John Bew (bookseller) (1774–1793), bookseller and publisher in London
John Bew (historian), professor of history